This is a list of springs.

Asia
 Baotu Spring, Jinan, Shandong, China ("City of Springs")
 Gihon Spring, Jerusalem
 Wolmyeongdong Spring, South Korea
 Al-Hasa Springs, Saudi Arabia
 Beitou District, Taiwan
 Su'ao Cold Spring, Yilan, Taiwan

Europe
 Vrelo Bosne, Ilidža, Bosnia
 Farmakas, Troodos Mountains, Cyprus
 Bath, England
 Buxton, England
 Harrogate, England
 , Hollola, Finland
 Fontaine de Vaucluse, France
 20-Pipe Well, Altleiningen, Germany
 Aachtopf, Germany
 Sachsenbrunnen, Bad Harzburg, Germany
 Castalian Spring, Delphi, Greece
 Pierian Spring, Pieria, Greece
 Spring of Juturna, Roman Forum, Rome, Italy
 Afyonkarahisar, Turkey
 Termal, Yalova, Turkey

North America
 Ice River Spring, Nunavut, Canada
 Bagby Hot Springs, Oregon
 Barton Springs, Texas
 Berkeley Springs, West Virginia
 Bennett Spring, Missouri
 Big Spring, Texas
 Big Spring, Missouri
 Big Springs, Idaho
 Blue Spring, Florida
 Comal Springs, Texas
 Giant Springs, Montana
 Grand Prismatic Spring, Wyoming
 Greer Spring, Missouri
 Homosassa Springs, Florida
 Mammoth Spring, Arkansas
 Maramec Spring, Missouri
 Montezuma Well, Arizona
 Niagara Springs, Idaho
 Poland Spring, Maine
 Ponce de Leon Springs, Georgia
 Kitch-iti-kipi, Michigan
 Las Estacas, Morelos
 Little Salt Spring, Florida
 Radium Hot Springs, British Columbia
 Rainbow Springs, Florida
 San Marcos Springs, Texas
 Sanlando Springs, Florida
 Saratoga Springs, New York
 Silver Springs, Florida
 Wakulla Springs, Florida
 Warm Springs, Georgia
 Wekiwa Springs, Florida
 Weeki Wachee Springs, Florida

Oceania
 Hanmer Springs, Canterbury, New Zealand
 Hot Water Beach, Waikato, New Zealand
 Innot Hot Springs, Queensland, Australia
 Paeroa, Waikato, New Zealand
 Te Waikoropupu Springs, Tasman, New Zealand
 Tjuwaliyn (Douglas) Hot Springs, Northern Territory, Australia

South America
 Cacheuta Spa, Argentina
 Puritama Hot Springs, Chile
 Puyehue Hot Springs, Chile
 São Lourenço, Minas Gerais, Brazil

References 

 
 List